Birds described in 1882 include Blue-footed booby, Somali bee-eater, Growling riflebird, Mouse-coloured penduline tit, Orange-bellied manakin, Ouvea parakeet, Peacock coquette, Reichard's seedeater, Silver-capped fruit dove, Speckle-chested piculet, Tepui toucanet

Events
Death of Norman Boyd Kinnear and Charles Darwin
Museo Civico di Storia Naturale di Milano built to house the collection of Hercules Turati
 Anton Reichenow names Böhm's bee-eater to honour Richard Böhm

Publications
William Alexander Forbes, 1882. Report on the anatomy of the petrels (Tubinares) collected during the voyage of H.M.S. Challenger, in the years 1873-1876. Reports of Science Research Voyage of H.M.S. Challenger. Zoology. 4(11): 1–64.
Georges Révoil, J Terrier, Charles Emile Cuisin, A Franchet Faune et flore des pays Çomalis (Afrique orientale) Paris : Challamel Ainé, Éditeur, 1882.
Mission scientifique du cap Horn, 1882–1883. - France. - France. Ministère de la marine - France. Ministère de l'éducation nationale'Paris :Gauthier-Villars,1885-1891.
Anton Reichenow Conspectus Psittacorum : systematische Uebersicht aller bekannten Papageienarten Berlin : A. Reichenow,1882. online BHL

Ongoing events
John Gould The birds of Asia 1850-83 7 vols. 530 plates, Artists: J. Gould, H. C. Richter, W. Hart and J. Wolf; Lithographers:H. C. Richter and W. Hart
Osbert Salvin and Frederick DuCane Godman 1879–1904. Biologia Centrali-Americana . Aves
Richard Bowdler Sharpe Catalogue of the Birds in the British Museum London,1874-98.
Jean Cabanis, Anton Reichenow and other members of the German Ornithologists' Society  in Journal für Ornithologie online BHL
Jean Cabanis, Anton Reichenow, Herman Schalow, Gustav Hartlaub and other members of the German Ornithologists' Society in  Ornithologisches Centralblatt Leipzig :L.A. Kittler,1876-82. online 
The Ibis

References

Bird
Birding and ornithology by year